Al-Rawda is a village in Al Bayda District, Al Bayda Governorate, Yemen.

According to the 2004 Yemen Census, the population of the village was 504. In 2014, the population of the village reached 677.

References 

 National Information Center, Yemen.
 Comprehensive guide to all regions in Yemen - دليلك الشامل إلي اليمن، كل مناطقها.

Populated places in Al Bayda Governorate